The International Consortium of Universities for the Study of Biodiversity and the Environment or iCUBE aims to connect a group of public research universities to form a consortium to address the problems and issues related to biodiversity and the environment, for both research and educational purposes.

Members
iCUBE is composed of a key group of public research universities sharing a common mission whilst committed to education and research on the environment, biodiversity and climate change, namely:
 King's College London 
 Korea University 
 Monash University 
 National University of Singapore
 Universiti Brunei Darussalam 
 University of Auckland
 University of Bonn
 University of North Carolina at Chapel Hill

Objective
iCUBE aims to promote awareness and understanding, disseminate knowledge as well conduct collaborative research on problems and issues relevant to the environment and biodiversity. The group is designed to strengthen the existing international linkages and further it by promoting educational and intellectual exchanges as well as collaboration among scholars and students.

References

Biodiversity